The Badger Institute, formerly the Wisconsin Policy Research Institute, is a nonprofit policy research organization based in Milwaukee, Wisconsin. It supports free markets and limited government. It played a prominent role in the development of the state's school voucher program and has formulated recommendations for the state's higher education system.

See also

 MacIver Institute

References

External links
 

Political and economic think tanks in the United States
Milwaukee County, Wisconsin
Conservative organizations in the United States

Non-profit organizations based in Wisconsin
501(c)(3) organizations